Thomas Hyde (1636–1703) was an English Orientalist.

Thomas Hyde may also refer to:
Thomas Hyde (Catholic exile) (1524–1597), English educator and Catholic exile
Thomas W. Hyde (1841–1899), general in the American Civil War
Tom Hyde (born 1945), American chiropractor

See also